Vanderpool (also Galltown, Gaul Town, or Woodsborough) is an unincorporated community in Highland County, Virginia, United States. The community is situated near Vanderpool Gap, through which the Jackson River flows. Before the creation of Highland County in 1847, Vanderpool was proposed to be the new county's seat, though it was defeated in favor of Monterey. Vanderpool was named after the Dutch explorer John Vanderpool, who was the first man to pass through the area on horseback and discovered the Vanderpool Gap.

References

Unincorporated communities in Highland County, Virginia
Unincorporated communities in Virginia